A Bramble House Christmas is a 2017 American-Canadian romantic drama. It was directed by Steven R. Monroe and starred Autumn Reeser and David Haydn-Jones. It premiered on Hallmark Movies & Mysteries on November 19, 2017.

Plot 
When a terminally ill patient leaves his nurse (Willa) $100,000 in his will, the family gets suspicious. Finn, the man's son, travels to Bramble, Oregon, to investigate. He meets Willa in the B&B where she and her son are spending Christmas. And nothing is what Finn had thought...

Cast
Autumn Reeser as Willa Fairchild
David Haydn-Jones as Finn Conrad
Liam Hughes as Scout Fairchild
Teryl Rothery as Mable Bramble
Andrew Airlie as Ken
Hilary Jardine as Sage
Julia Benson as Molly
Lyla Marlow as Savannah

Production
The film was shot during three weeks in Vancouver, British Columbia, in July 2017.

References

External links

Hallmark Channel original films
Canadian drama television films
English-language Canadian films
2017 television films
2017 films
Films set in Oregon
Films shot in Vancouver
2017 romantic drama films
American drama television films
2010s American films
2010s Canadian films
2010s English-language films